Parkdale is a Charlotte, North Carolina neighborhood that generally includes the streets of Manning Dr. (west of Topping Pl.), Wintercrest Ln. (north of Scofield Rd.), and Scofield Rd. (west of Topping Pl.).

History
Originally existing as part of the historic Billy Graham family dairy farm property and Morrison Farms, Parkdale was laid out in the late 1950s and consists of many split level and ranch-style  houses, which are typical of that era and conform to the hilly terrain. Many of the houses in Parkdale were built by the Geo. Goodyear Company of Charlotte. When originally planned, the entrance to the neighborhood was concentrated on Manning Dr. off of Park Rd. The entrance sign at this intersection was made of brick that is similar to what the houses were built of in the neighborhood. This entrance sign is currently in disrepair, which obscures Parkdale's historical presence. The area retains its diverse mix of mature Magnolia, White Oak, Tuliptree, Maple, Eastern White Pine, and Willow Oak trees; many of which pre-date the era of construction.

Marketing

Over the years, local realtors have attempted to market Parkdale as the adjacent Barclay Downs neighborhood in an attempt to eliminate the Parkdale name and increase property values in the area.  Realtors have misled many buyers in telling them that residents of Parkdale are eligible for immediate membership in Barclay Downs Pool without being placed on the waiting list but this is not true.  Parkdale residents may gain membership to the Pool but usually must be wait listed for up to 5 years depending upon current demand.

Walkability

Parkdale is a short 15 minute walk to SouthPark Mall and Symphony Park. The Park-Selwyn shopping center is also extremely close by, site of the original Giant Genie grocery store and pharmacy. The streets in Parkdale with sidewalks are Wintercrest Ln., Scofield Rd., and Park Rd. In August 2009 a new sidewalk was completed on Wintercrest Ln. that runs between Scofield Rd. and Fairview Rd.  The Mecklenburg County Parks and Recreation currently plans to build a greenway that will run between Manning Dr. and the Marion-Diehl Center off of Tyvola Rd.   The City of Charlotte is planning to build a sidewalk on Manning Dr. between Park Rd. and Wintercrest Rd.

Other

The official homeowner's association for Parkdale is called Parkdale League and there are no HOA fees.

External links
Briar Creek Greenway
Official Charlotte Neighborhoods 
Parkdale League (from NeighborhoodLink.com

Neighborhoods in Charlotte, North Carolina
Populated places established in the 1950s